This is page shows results of Canadian federal elections in the southern part of the province of Saskatchewan.

Regional profile
Southern Saskatchewan typically produces an extreme urban-rural split, although it has been masked by the Conservatives' near-sweep of the region from 2004 to 2011. The ridings that are entirely rural (e.g. Souris-Moose Mountain and Yorkton-Melville) are almost as conservative as ridings in rural Alberta, and are even more so now with issues like same-sex marriage being highly unpopular. The urban areas of Regina and Moose Jaw are traditionally more supportive of the New Democratic Party, but they were wiped out in three-way races in 2004, and were unable to recover in 2006 or 2008. The Liberals also has some support in Regina, but it really only translates into one seat - that of local born and raised veteran politician, former Finance Minister, former Public Safety Minister and former Liberal deputy leader Ralph Goodale.  Like Saskatoon, Regina has double the population of a typical Canadian urban riding.  However, until 2015 the surrounding areas were thought to be too thinly populated for ridings of their own.  As a result, for almost two decades Regina's four federal ridings included large blocks of rural territory.  The rural presence in the Regina area ridings largely neutralized the NDP and Liberal blocs after the end of vote-splitting on the right in 2004.

With the 2015 redistribution, Regina is now split between three ridings—one hybrid urban-rural riding and two located almost entirely within the city limits.  Mirroring the split in the city as a whole, each major party took one seat each, with the NDP winning a seat here for the first time since 2000. In 2019, however, the entire province swung over dramatically to support Conservative leader Andrew Scheer, who holds the hybrid urban-rural seat of Regina—Qu'Appelle. The Tories swept the entire region, in the process unseating the Prairies' highest-profile minister, Goodale. This left Regina with no centre-left MPs for the first time since 1965.

2021 - 44th General Election 

|-
| style="background-color:whitesmoke" |Cypress Hills—Grasslands
|
|Mackenzie Hird1,4924.35%
||
|Jeremy Patzer24,51871.53%
|
|Alex McPhee3,60410.51%
|
|Carol Vandale2840.83%
|
|Charles Reginald Hislop2,8268.24%
|
|Mark Skagen1,3603.97%
|
|Maria Rose Lewans1930.56%
||
|Jeremy Patzer
|-
| style="background-color:whitesmoke" |Moose Jaw—Lake Centre—Lanigan
|
|Katelyn Zimmer2,5266.13%
||
|Fraser Tolmie24,86960.39%
|
|Talon Regent7,97519.36%
|
|Isaiah Hunter4381.06%
|
|Chey Craik4,71211.44%
|
|David Craig Townsend6641.61%
|
|
||
|Tom Lukiwski†
|-
| style="background-color:whitesmoke" |Regina—Lewvan
|
|Susan Cameron6,31013.82%
||
|Warren Steinley21,37546.83%
|
|Tria Donaldson15,76334.54%
|
|Michael Wright5601.23%
|
|Roderick Kletchko1,6353.58%
|
|
|
|
||
|Warren Steinley
|-
| style="background-color:whitesmoke" |Regina—Qu'Appelle
|
|Cecilia Melanson3,34410.15%
||
|Andrew Scheer20,40061.90%
|
|Annaliese Bos6,87920.87%
|
|Naomi Hunter6682.03%
|
|Andrew Yubeta1,6685.06%
|
|
|
|
||
|Andrew Scheer
|-
| style="background-color:whitesmoke" |Regina—Wascana
|
|Sean McEachern10,39026.92%
||
|Michael Kram19,26149.90%
|
|Erin Hidlebaugh6,97518.07%
|
|Victor Lau6221.61%
|
|Mario Milanovski1,3523.50%
|
|
|
|
||
|Michael Kram
|-
| style="background-color:whitesmoke" |Souris—Moose Mountain
|
|Javin Ames-Sinclair1,6364.16%
||
|Robert Kitchen30,04976.38%
|
|Hannah Ann Duerr3,1077.90%
|
|
|
|Diane Neufeld3,5719.08%
|
|Greg Douglas9772.48%
|
|
||
|Robert Kitchen
|-
| style="background-color:whitesmoke" |Yorkton—Melville
|
|Jordan Ames-Sinclair2,1876.31%
||
|Cathay Wagantall23,79468.65%
|
|Halsten David Rust4,23912.23%
|
|Valerie Brooks6141.77%
|
|Braden Robertson3,2279.31%
|
|Denise Loucks5971.72%
|
|
||
|Cathay Wagantall
|}

2019 - 43rd General Election 

|-
| style="background-color:whitesmoke" |Cypress Hills—Grasslands
|
|William Caton1,5954.15%
||
|Jeremy Patzer31,14081.06%
|
|Trevor Peterson3,6669.54%
|
|Bill Clary7191.87%
|
|Lee Harding1,0752.80%
|
|Maria Lewans2200.57%
|
|
||
|David Anderson†$
|-
| style="background-color:whitesmoke" |Moose Jaw—Lake Centre—Lanigan
|
|Cecilia Melanson2,5175.60%
||
|Tom Lukiwski31,99371.12%
|
|Talon Regent7,66017.03%
|
|Gillian Walker1,2012.67%
|
|Chey Craik1,6133.59%
|
|
|
|
||
|Tom Lukiwski
|-
| style="background-color:whitesmoke" |Regina—Lewvan
|
|Winter Fedyk6,82613.23%
||
|Warren Steinley27,08852.48%
|
|Jigar Patel14,76728.61%
|
|Naomi Hunter2,0994.07%
|
|Trevor Wowk5731.11%
|
|Don Morgan2010.39%
|
|Ian Bridges (NCA)600.12%
||
|Erin Weir†
|-
|rowspan=2 style="background-color:whitesmoke" |Regina—Qu'Appelle
|rowspan=2 |
|rowspan=2 |Jordan Ames-Sinclair4,54311.72%
|rowspan=2 |
|rowspan=2 |Andrew Scheer24,46363.12%
|rowspan=2 |
|rowspan=2 |Ray Aldinger7,68519.83%
|rowspan=2 |
|rowspan=2 |Dale Dewar1,2823.31%
|rowspan=2 |
|rowspan=2 |Tracey Sparrowhawk5131.32%
|rowspan=2 |
|rowspan=2 |Kieran Szuchewycz780.20%
|
|Éric Normand (Rhino.)75 0.19%
|rowspan=2 |
|rowspan=2 |Andrew Scheer
|-
|
|James Plummer (Libert.)116 0.30%
|-
| style="background-color:whitesmoke" |Regina—Wascana
|
|Ralph Goodale15,24233.61%
||
|Michael Kram22,41849.43%
|
|Hailey Clark5,80112.79%
|
|Tamela Friesen1,3162.90%
|
|Mario Milanovski4500.99%
|
|Evangeline Godron1280.28%
|
|
||
|Ralph Goodale
|-
| style="background-color:whitesmoke" |Souris—Moose Mountain
|
|Javin Ames-Sinclair1,7184.13%
||
|Robert Kitchen35,06784.40%
|
|Ashlee Hicks3,2147.74%
|
|Judy Mergel6811.64%
|
|Phillip Zajac7021.69%
|
|
|
|Travis Patron (CNP)1680.40%
||
|Robert Kitchen
|-
| style="background-color:whitesmoke" |Yorkton—Melville
|
|Connor Moen2,4886.42%
||
|Cathay Wagantall29,52376.15%
|
|Carter Antoine4,74712.24%
|
|Stacey Wiebe1,0702.76%
|
|Ryan Schultz9412.43%
|
|
|
|
||
|Cathay Wagantall
|}

2015 - 42nd General Election

2011 - 41st General Election

2008 - 40th General Election

2006 - 39th General Election

2004 - 38th General Election

Cypress Hills-Grasslands
Palliser
Regina-Lumsden-Lake Centre
Regina-Qu'Appelle
Souris-Moose Mountain
Wascana
Yorkton-Melville

2000 - 37th General Election

References

Saskatchewan, South
Elections in Saskatchewan